Brantford City was a federal electoral district in Ontario, Canada, that was represented in the House of Commons of Canada from 1925 to 1949. This riding was created in 1924 from parts of Brantford riding.

It consisted initially of the City of Brantford (according to its 1914 boundaries) and the township of Oakland and the part of the township of Brantford lying south and west of the Grand River, in the county of Brant.

The electoral district was abolished in 1947 when it was merged into Brantford riding.

Members of Parliament

This riding elected the following members of the House of Commons of Canada:

Election results

|}

|}

|}

|}

|}

|}

See also 

 List of Canadian federal electoral districts
 Past Canadian electoral districts

External links 
Riding history from the Library of Parliament

Former federal electoral districts of Ontario